Joseph Thomas Carter (born June 23, 1962) is a former American football running back in the National Football League. He was drafted by the Miami Dolphins in the fourth round of the 1984 NFL Draft. He played college football at Alabama.

References

1962 births
Living people
Sportspeople from Starkville, Mississippi
Players of American football from Mississippi
American football running backs
Alabama Crimson Tide football players
Miami Dolphins players
Starkville High School alumni